The Haruka Nogizaka's Secret animated television series is based on the light novel series of the same name written by Yūsaku Igarashi and illustrated by Shaa. The episodes, produced by Studio Barcelona, are directed by Munenori Nawa, written by Tsuyoshi Tamai, and features character design by Satoshi Ishino who based the designs on Shaa's original concept. A pre-broadcast aired on July 3, 2008 and 12 episodes were produced which aired in Japan between July 10 and September 25, 2008 on Chiba TV and TV Kanagawa. Six DVD compilation volumes were released by Geneon Entertainment between September 26, 2008 and February 27, 2009. A Blu-ray Disc box set of the series was released in Japan on September 26, 2009.

A second anime series entitled  was directed by Munenori Nawa and produced by Studio Barcelona under the name Diomedea. The second season aired in Japan between October 6 and December 22, 2009 and contains 12 episodes. A four-episode original video animation series titled Haruka Nogizaka's Secret: Finale was broadcast on AT-X and Tokyo MX between August 17 and November 25, 2012. The four BD/DVD volumes were published between August 29 and November 28, 2012.

Two pieces of theme music are used for the episodes of both seasons; one opening theme and one ending theme each.

Haruka Nogizaka's Secret

Haruka Nogizaka's Secret: Purezza

Haruka Nogizaka's Secret: Finale

References

External links
Anime official website 

Haruka Nogizaka's Secret